Buthionine sulfoximine (BSO) is a sulfoximine derivative which reduces levels of glutathione and is being investigated as an adjunct with chemotherapy in the treatment of cancer.  The compound inhibits gamma-glutamylcysteine synthetase, the enzyme required in the first step of glutathione synthesis.  Buthionine sulfoximine may also be used to increase the sensitivity of parasites to oxidative antiparasitic drugs.

References

Amino acids
Antineoplastic drugs
Sulfoximines